Archibald Henderson Scales (April 14, 1868 – February 16, 1952) was a rear admiral in the United States Navy. He was Superintendent of the United States Naval Academy in Annapolis, Maryland, from February 12, 1919, to July 5, 1921.

Early life 
Scales was born in Greensboro, North Carolina, to Junius Irving and Euphemia Hamilton (Henderson). He was the nephew of Alfred Moore Scales, and attended public schools in Greensboro before entering the United States Naval Academy (USNA), which he graduated from in 1887. Scales was made an ensign on July 1, 1889.

Naval service 
In 1895, Scales went on duty in Asia, on the ocean off of Amoy, and led the rescue of the German steamer Tai Chiong. He landed at Seoul and protected the Emperor of Korea, who had sought refuge in the Russian legation. Scales then was made a junior lieutenant on August 28, 1897. He served on the  during the Spanish–American War, fighting in the Battle of Nipe Bay. He earned the Sampson Medal for service during that war.

While with the Missouri, he went on a trip around the world. He next commanded the Receiving Ship of the Naval Training Station in Norfolk, Virginia, until 1916. In that capacity, he fought in World War I as part of the Grand Fleet in the 6th Battalion Squadron under David Beatty. For service in the war, Scales received the Distinguished Service Medal and was made a Commander of the Order of Leopold. Upon the end of the war, Scales assumed command of the Naval Station Great Lakes from December 1918 to February 1919.

He then became Superintendent of the United States Naval Academy, where he handled a scandal. In 1921, he took command of Battleship Division Five. After, Scales led the Fourth Naval District from 1923 until he retired in 1926. He was a delegate at the Transylvania Celebration in Kentucky and died at the U.S. Naval Hospital in Bethesda, Maryland. He is buried in Arlington National Cemetery. Scales married Harriet Pierce Graham and had three children.

References

Superintendents of the United States Naval Academy
United States Navy admirals
1868 births
1950 deaths
People from Greensboro, North Carolina
United States Naval Academy alumni